Oxenberg or Oxenburg may refer to:

Catherine Oxenberg (born 1961), American actress of Serbian origin
Christina Oxenberg (born 1962), Serbian-American writer, humorist, and fashion designer
India Oxenberg (born 1991), American film producer and child actress
Jan Oxenberg, American film producer, film director, film editor and scenarist
Allen Oxenburg (1927–1992), American opera director

See also
The Princes of Oxenburg, a series of books by American author Karen Hawkins
Oxemberg, an Indian clothing brand